Yehudiya ("Jewish") is an abandoned village and archeological site in the center of the Golan Heights, about 5 kilometers south of Katzrin within the Yehudiya Forest Nature Reserve.

Ancient Jewish settlement
In the houses of the village, artifacts were found which attest to the existence of a settlement from the Roman–Byzantine period. According to multiple testimonies, there was a Jewish presence there after the Arab conquest. The Jewish past of the settlement was known to the Arabs who settled there later, hence its name.

Modern times
In the 19th century Arab peasants settled in the village houses. Near the village there is a large stone house that was used as a farm and employed many local villagers. After the establishment of the State of Israel, the Syrians renamed the village "Arabiya" to blur its Jewish past. The village was depopulated in 1967 with the occupation of the Golan Heights by the IDF during the Six-Day War. The ruins of the village are now part of the Yehudiya Forest reserve, covering 66 square kilometers.

References

Golan Heights
Former populated places on the Golan Heights
Ancient Jewish settlements of the Golan Heights